Lower Monumental Lock and Dam is a hydroelectric, concrete, run-of-the-river dam in the northwest United States.

Construction began in June 1961, and the main structure and three generators were completed  in 1969, with an additional three generators finished in 1981. Generating capacity is 810 megawatts, with an overload capacity of 932 MW.

Built and operated by the U.S. Army Corps of Engineers, Lower Monumental Dam is part of the Columbia River Basin system of dams.

Navigation lock
 Single-lift
 Width:  
 Length:

See also

List of dams in the Columbia River watershed
Lower Granite Dam
Little Goose Dam
Ice Harbor Dam

References

External links 

 Lower Monumental Lock & Dam @ US Army Corps of Engineers

Dams in Washington (state)
Dams on the Snake River
Gravity dams
Hydroelectric power plants in Washington (state)
Run-of-the-river power stations
Buildings and structures in Franklin County, Washington
Buildings and structures in Walla Walla County, Washington
Dams completed in 1969
1969 establishments in Washington (state)
Energy infrastructure completed in 1969
Energy infrastructure completed in 1981
United States Army Corps of Engineers dams